The Ycuá Bolaños supermarket fire was a disastrous fire that occurred on 1 August 2004 in Asunción, Paraguay. After the fire broke out, exits were locked to prevent people from stealing merchandise. The building also lacked adequate fire protection systems. Over 300 people were killed and more than 500 were injured. The president of the supermarket company, as well as various employees, were later sentenced to prison terms for their actions during the fire.

Background 
The Ycuá Bolaños V supermarket, located in the capital city of Asunción, Paraguay, opened on 7 December 2001. The two-story building consisted of an underground parking garage on the lower level and a sales area and food court on the second story. Two separate mezzanines contained administrative offices and an extension of the food court.

According to the defense attorney of the building's owner, the bakery and food court kitchen were not properly ventilated, which would cause smoke and gas to accumulate in the building. The structure also lacked a fire sprinkler system and the smoke detectors did not work.

Fire
The fire broke out on 1 August 2004, with two explosions on the first floor.  The fire burned for seven hours before firefighters were able to extinguish it. The final death toll was 327, and more than 300 injured. The cause was believed to be a faulty barbecue chimney that leaked hot flammable gases into the ceiling, which ignited.

Several survivors of the fire and volunteer firefighters alleged that, when the fire broke out, doors within the complex were deliberately closed under the direction of the owners, Juan Pío Paiva and his son, Víctor Daniel, trapping people inside, in order to prevent people from fleeing with merchandise without paying for it. The management of the shopping center denied the charge. Paiva, his son and a security guard surrendered to the police and were formally charged.

Aftermath
On 5 December 2006, Juan Pío Paiva, Víctor Daniel Paiva and the security guard were convicted of involuntary manslaughter with a maximum penalty of five years in prison. The prosecution however was seeking a 25-year prison term. As the verdict was read, angry survivors and family members of the deceased started a violent demonstration inside the courtroom, which later spread onto the streets of Asunción. The prosecution demanded a retrial.

On 2 February 2008, a new court ruled that the trio committed negligent homicide. Juan Pío Paiva, president of the company, received a sentence of 12 years in prison. His son Víctor Daniel Paiva, present at the start of the fire, was sentenced to 10 years in jail. Security guard Daniel Areco, who closed the doors, was sentenced to 5 years in prison. Additionally, shareholder Humberto Casaccia, also present at the start of the fire, was sentenced to two-and-a-half years in prison for endangering people in the workplace. Architect Bernardo Ismachowiez, who both designed and built the complex, spent two years under house arrest for "dangerous activities in construction". Both Víctor Daniel and Juan Pío have since been released on probation in 2013 and 2014 respectively, after a ruling from the Court of Appeals decided they were to serve the remainder of the sentence in liberty for good behavior.

References

2004 in Paraguay
2004 fires in South America
August 2004 crimes
August 2004 events in South America
2000s in Asunción
Fires in Paraguay
Fire disasters involving barricaded escape routes
Commercial building fires
Events in Asunción
2004 disasters in Paraguay